The World Hockey Association 2 was a minor professional ice hockey league created at the instigation of the organizers of the proposed recreated World Hockey Association to serve as its development league.  The WHA2 teams — some of which had played the 2002–03 season in the Atlantic Coast Hockey League — were all in the southeastern United States. David Waronker was the league's founder and also served as the league's commissioner.

The WHA2 operated in the 2003–04 season only, after which (due to a falling-out with the parent organization) it was served a cease-and-desist from the WHA and ceased operations. David Waronker was credited with both the founding and collapse of the league. In addition he owned or co-owned all of the teams in the league. Its surviving teams merged with survivors of the South East Hockey League to form the Southern Professional Hockey League for the 2004–2005 season.

The Jacksonville Barracudas won the WHA2's first and only President's Cup. Jacksonville also hosted the first and only WHA2 All-Star Game.

Teams
 Orlando Seals (became the Florida Seals for the 2005–06 SPHL season)
 Jacksonville Barracudas (moved to SPHL for 2004–05)
 Macon Trax (moved to SPHL for 2004–05) 
 Miami Manatees (folded after 2003–04)
 Lakeland Loggerheads (folded after 2003–04)
 Alabama Slammers (folded after 2003–04)

2003–04 season

Regular season

Playoffs

See also
List of developmental and minor sports leagues
List of ice hockey leagues

References

 
Defunct ice hockey leagues in the United States
2003–04 in American ice hockey by league
2003 establishments in the United States
2004 disestablishments in the United States
Sports leagues established in 2003
Sports leagues disestablished in 2004